Ruby’s Diner opened its doors December 7, 1982, on Balboa Pier in Newport Beach, California. Over 40 years ago, a small bait shack sitting on the end of the pier was converted to our first Diner. Surrounded by the Pacific Ocean, with a name as simple as its menu, Ruby’s Diner offers the Highest Quality Burgers, Fries, and Shakes. And, with a service motto of “Make Room for Everyone”, Ruby’s Diner has become the quintessential community Diner serving up memorable "Diner Moments". Welcome to Ruby’s, "Share the Love!"

History

The first Ruby's Diner opened on December 7, 1982, in a converted bait shop at the end of the Balboa Pier in Newport Beach, California. On that day, founders Doug Cavanaugh and Ralph Kosmides worked the grill and the cashier station and earned a total of $63.

Ruby's Diner has locations on the historic Southern California piers of Balboa Pier & Oceanside. A former Ruby's Diner at the end of the Seal Beach pier, which was closed in 2013, was destroyed by a fire on May 20, 2016. In late February 2021, another at the Huntington Beach Pier had shut down.

In 2013, Ruby's Diner introduced Ruby's Dinette, a 1960s themed fast casual concept, and began opening restaurants under this name and style starting in the Westfield Plaza Bonita shopping mall in National City, California.

On January 20, 2020, Ruby's Diner closed at Suburban Square after nearly 25 years. On September 8, 2020 the Redondo Beach location also shut down.

From mid-March 2020 to March 2021, all restaurants had to abandon in-room dining to combat the COVID-19 pandemic. There was still take-away & pickup service available. April 2021 saw most restaurants open patio dining besides in-room dining, provided the tables are separated for social distancing.

Origin of the Ruby girl
Ruby Cavanaugh, the mother of founder Doug Cavanaugh was the inspiration for the restaurant name and its logo. The Ruby girl cheesecake character was derived from a photograph taken of her while cheerleading for Fremont High School in Los Angeles. In recognition of Ruby, every Ruby's Diner location has a copy of Ruby's high school graduation picture near the cash register.

See also
 List of hamburger restaurants

References

External links

1982 establishments in California
Companies based in Irvine, California
Diners in the United States
Hamburger restaurants
Restaurant chains in the United States
Restaurant franchises
Restaurants established in 1982
Companies that filed for Chapter 11 bankruptcy in 2018